Hugo Oscar Coscia (born 12 October 1952) is a retired football striker who played for several clubs in the Argentine Primera División and the Argentina national football team.

Career
Born in Chacabuco, Buenos Aires, Coscia began playing professional football with Estudiantes de La Plata in the Primera División. Next, he passed through Colón de Santa Fe.

In 1975, Coscia moved abroad to play for Mexican Primera División side Atlético Potosino for two seasons. When his contract expired, Coscia returned to Argentina to play for Club Atlético River Plate. In 1979, Coscia joined San Lorenzo de Almagro and would play in the club's final match at Estadio Gasómetro, a 0-0 draw with Club Atlético Boca Juniors where Coscia had a penalty kick saved by Hugo Gatti. The following season, he joined Boca Juniors, making Coscia one of a select few players to appear for rivals River Plate and Boca Juniors.

Coscia made several appearances for the Argentina national football team and participated in the 1979 Copa América.

References

External links
 
 
 Hugo Coscia at BDFA.com.ar 

1952 births
Living people
Argentine footballers
Argentine expatriate footballers
Argentina international footballers
1979 Copa América players
Estudiantes de La Plata footballers
Club Atlético Colón footballers
Club Atlético River Plate footballers
San Lorenzo de Almagro footballers
Boca Juniors footballers
Rosario Central footballers
San Luis F.C. players
Liga MX players
Expatriate footballers in Mexico
Association football forwards
Sportspeople from Buenos Aires Province